Quintanar del Rey is a municipality in Cuenca, Castile-La Mancha, Spain. It has a population of 8,043.

References

Municipalities in the Province of Cuenca